Chevella is a town, mandal and suburb of Hyderabad in Ranga Reddy district of the Indian state of Telangana. It is the headquarters of surrounding villages with many government establishments like Judicial court, Revenue Division Office, Acp office under Cyberabad Metropolitan Police. It is also an educational hub with many schools, junior colleges, engineering colleges, business schools etc. There are many hospitals located along with a medical college, the Dr. Patnam Reddy Institute of Medical Sciences. It has become a part of Hyderabad Metropolitan Development Authority.

Location 
Chevella is located in western part of newly carved Ranga Reddy district with co-ordinates .

Population
Chevella is a town in Chevella mandal of Rangareddy district in Telangana. Per the Census 2011, there are 1,559 families residing in the town. The population of is 7,031, of which 3,553 are males and 3,478 are females thus the average sex ratio of is 979. The population of children of under age 7 is 894, which is 13% of the total population. There are 463 male children and 431 female children under age 7, thus the child sex ratio is 931, which is less than average sex ratio (979). The literacy rate is 72.5%, thus Chevella has a higher literacy rate than the 66.8% of Rangareddy district. The male literacy rate is 81.72% and the female literacy rate is 63.08%.

Politics 
Chevella gram panchayat is the local self-government of the village. The panchayat is divided into wards and each ward is represented by an elected ward member. The ward members are headed by a Sarpanch.

Chevella was in political limelight when it was represented by Late P.Indra Reddy and after his demise his wife Sabitha Indra Reddy.

Chevella (SC) (Assembly constituency) of Telangana Legislative Assembly. The present MLA representing the constituency is Kale Yadaiah of Telangana Rashtra Samithi.

Chevella (Lok Sabha constituency)
The present Member of parliament (India) representing the constituency is Ranjeet Reddy of Telangana Rashtra Samithi

Chevella Revenue Division
Chevella revenue division is an administrative division in the Rangareddy district of the Indian state of Telangana. It is one of the 5 revenue divisions in the district with 4 mandals under its administration. Chevella serves as the headquarters of the division.

The Revenue Division  presently comprises the following Mandals

Transport 
TSRTC runs buses from Hyderabad City, they are
Route No. : 288 & 593 Mehidipatnam to Moinabad-Chevella.

Rail 

Air 
The nearest air transport facility is Hyderabad International Airport, which is 28 km from Chevella.

Roads 
The NH-44 link road passes through the town.

Education 
Chevella Mandal falls under the jurisdiction of Osmania University. The Mandal has many government and private  junior, undergraduate and graduate colleges, engineering colleges, and a private medical college.

The primary and secondary school education is imparted by the government schools such as Mandal Parishad, Mandal Parishad upper primary and Zilla Parishad High Schools and private high schools.

Important festivals 
Bathukamma and Lashkar Bonalu are states official festivals besides these Dussehra, Diwali, Holi, Sri Ramanavami, Shivaratri, Ugadi, Ganesh Chaturthi, Bakrid, Ramzan are the major festivals celebrated in Chevella Mandal.

Crops
The place is suitable for harvesting carrots (10-15 truckloads of carrots are transported to Hyderabad every day). Since Chevella is close to the city, farmers grow vegetables and flowers. In the recent years, the town has been hub to a lot of houses where flowers are grown. In addition, farmers grow other crops including tomato, flowers and vegetables, as well as rice, jower, cotton, and corn.

References

Cities and towns in Ranga Reddy district